Club Deportivo Herbania is a Spanish football team based in Puerto del Rosario, in the autonomous community of Canary Islands. Founded in 1945, it plays in Tercera División RFEF – Group 12, holding home matches at Estadio Municipal de Los Pozos, with a capacity of 2,000 people.

Season to season

1 season in Tercera División RFEF

References

External links
 
Soccerway team profile

Football clubs in the Canary Islands
Sport in Las Palmas
Association football clubs established in 1945
1945 establishments in Spain